The M-10 motorway or the Karachi Northern Bypass is a two-lane 57 km motorway in Karachi, Sindh, Pakistan. It connects the M-9 motorway to the Karachi Port, and provides an easy access to the transporters and to the commuters who can go directly to the Karachi port without entering the main arteries of city.

Route 
The M-10 begins north of Karachi at the end of Muhammad Ali Jinnah Road, near the junction of the M-9 to which it is connected through a trumpet interchange. It then continues north for a few kilometers before turning west, where it forms an interchange with the N-25. After this interchange, it eventually turns south back towards Karachi and merges onto the KPT Flyover at Karachi Port.

History
The contract for the construction work was awarded to M/s ECI in May 2002 for Rs. 645.17 million through open bidding. The National Logistics Cell started the construction in June 2002, and completed it in 2007. Yousaf Barakzai of the National Highway Authority served as the project director. The project was inaugurated by President Pervez Musharraf on 6 August 2007 at a total cost of Rs. 3.5 billion.

Junctions and interchanges

Bridge collapse
On 1 September 2007, the Shershah Bridge collapsed along the Karachi Northern Bypass, which had opened in August 2007. Six people were killed, while many others were injured.

See also
 Expressways of Pakistan
 National Highways of Pakistan
 Transport in Pakistan
 National Highway Authority
 Lyari Expressway
 M9 motorway (Pakistan)
 Transport in Karachi

References

External links

M10
Highways in Karachi